Kirtland Kelsey Cutter  (August 20, 1860 – September 26, 1939) was a 20th-century architect in the Pacific Northwest and California. He was born in East Rockport, Ohio, the great-grandson of Jared Potter Kirtland. He studied painting and illustration at the Art Students League of New York. At the age of 26 he moved to Spokane, Washington, and began working as a banker for his uncle. By the 1920s Cutter had designed several hundred buildings that established Spokane as a place rivaling Seattle and Portland, Oregon in its architectural quality. Most of Cutter's work is listed in State and National Registers of Historic Places.

His design for the 1893 Chicago World's Fair Idaho Building was a rustic design log construction. It was a popular favorite, visited by an estimated 18 million people. The building's design and interior furnishings were a major precursor of the Arts and Crafts movement.

Cutter also worked in partnership with Karl G. Malmgren as Cutter & Malmgren and variations.

Notable designs

Buildings in Spokane, Washington

 1887: Kirtland Cutter's Chalet Hohenstein 628 West 7th Avenue – was demolished to build condominiums in the 1960s
 1888: Glover Mansion 321 W Eighth Avenue – Now a conference and events center.
 1889: F. Lewis Clark Lodge Gate 705 West 7th Avenue – temporary home for Clark
 1889: F. Lewis Clark House 703 West 7th Avenue – Clark named it Undercliff it was later changed to Marycliff
 1889: F. Rockwood Moore House 507 West 7th Avenue 
 1897: John A. Finch House 2340 W First Avenue – Designed with Karl Malmgren.
 1897: Austin Corbin House 815 West 7th Avenue 
 1897: D. C. Corbin House 507 West 7th Avenue – Now houses the Corbin Art Center
 1898: Amasa B. Campbell House 2316 W First Avenue – Now part of the Northwest Museum of Arts and Culture.
 1898: Patsy Clark Mansion 2208 West Second Avenue – Contains the largest stained glass window ever made by Tiffany Studios.
 1898: Wakefield House, 2328 W First Avenue – First example of Mission Revival Style architecture in Washington State.
 c. 1900: Manito United Methodist Church, 3220 S Grand Blvd
 1904: Robert E. Strahorn Residence Strahorn Pines designed by J.J. Browne in 1887 remodeled by Cutter
 1907: J.M. Corbet Corbet-Aspray House 820 West 7th Avenue 
 1907: Gardner and Engdahl/The Gables Apartments 1302–1312 West Broadway Avenue
1909: Post Street Electric Substation – designed for Washington Water Power, now called Avista
 c. 1910: The Hall of Doges, above Davenport's Restaurant – see The Davenport Hotel
 1910: Spokane Club, 1002 W Riverside Avenue
 1910: Western Union Life Insurance Building
 1911: Monroe Street Bridge – Designed aesthetic elements.
 1912: Waikiki Mansion – Now Gonzaga University's Bozarth Center.
 1912: Louis Davenport House 34 West 8th Avenue
 1914: The Davenport Hotel
 1915: Sherwood Building 510 West Riverside

Other Washington State sites
 1892: Wardner's Castle 1103 15th Street, Bellingham, Washington – Now a bed and breakfast known as Hilltop House.
 1893: Cutter House 802 North Yakima Avenue, Tacoma, Washington
 1904: Rainier Club, Seattle, Washington
 1905: Remodeling of the Tacoma Hotel, Tacoma, Washington, – Designed by McKim, Mead & White in 1883.
 1906-1908: Charles J. Smith house, 1147 Harvard Avenue E, Seattle
 c. 1909 Yale Hotel in Chewelah – Designed with Karl Malmgren. 
 1909: Thornewood Castle, Lakewood, Washington – Set of Rose Red TV movie by Stephen King 
 1912: Cutter Theatre, Metaline Falls, Washington – Formerly the Metaline Falls High School Building
 1912: Rock House, 102 5th Ave Metaline Falls, Washington – Private residence on the Pend Oreille River.
 1922: Heather Hill 11430 Gravelly Lake Dr SW, Tacoma

Out of state locations

 1893: Idaho Building, Chicago, Illinois for World's Columbian Exposition in partnership with John C. Poetz
 1895: Charles E. Conrad Mansion, Kalispell, Montana
 1898: Charles Stimson Stimson-Green Mansion 1204 Minor Ave Seattle
 1902: Kirtland Hall, New Haven, Connecticut – Sheffield Scientific School
 1903: Carnegie Camp North Point, Raquette Lake, New York- Summer Home of Lucy Carnegie
 1904: Idaho State Building, St. Louis, Missouri for Louisiana Purchase Exposition.
 1906: The Hurlbut Mansion, Lewiston, Idaho – Formerly the Children's Home Finding and Aid Society of North Idaho
 1907: Fredrick Blackwell Residence - Located in Spirit Lake, IDAHO - designed by Cutter
 1908: Seattle Golf and Country Club
 1913: John P.and Stella Gray Estate, Coeur d'Alene, Idaho
 1913: Lake McDonald Lodge, Glacier National Park
 1913: William H. Cowles House Eucalyptus Hill Santa Barbara, California
 1917: Wilcox Manor, Portland, Oregon
 1922: Lewis-Clark Hotel, Lewiston, Idaho]
 1926: Autzen Mansion, Portland, Oregon
 1929: Los Cerritos, Long Beach, California – three homes in subdivision
 1937: Fleming House, Balboa Island, Newport Beach, California – Built for Victor Fleming, director of The Wizard of Oz and Gone with the Wind

References

External links
 "Kirtland Cutter" at History Link: The Free Online Encyclopedia of Washington State History

 
19th-century American architects
Arts and Crafts architects
Rustic style architects
1860 births
1939 deaths
Art Students League of New York alumni
Artists from Spokane, Washington
Architects from Washington (state)
20th-century American architects
People from Lakewood, Ohio
Architects from Ohio